The 2009 Auckland Rugby League season was the 2009 season of senior rugby league in Auckland. The Auckland Rugby League ran the various competitions. The season commenced on 14 March with the start of the Phelan Shield and ended on 5 September with the Fox Memorial Grand Final. This was the 100th season of the competition, which began with the 1910 season.

The season followed the same format as 2008, with a qualification series in the first half of the year giving sixteen teams the opportunity to enter the Fox Memorial competition.

Beginning 7 June two games a week were broadcast in both English and Māori on Māori Television and Te Reo respectively.

Fox Memorial Qualification Series
The Lion Red Fox Memorial Qualification Series involved sixteen teams divided into two pools, with the top eight teams entering the Fox Memorial competition. It started on 21 March and concluded on 2 May. The bottom eight teams instead entered the Sharman Cup.

Phelan Shield
The Mandron Masonry Phelan Shield began on 14 March and features eleven teams. The regular season concluded on 5 September with a grand final. The New Lynn Stags were the defending champions. Minor premiers the Manukau Magpies defeated the Waiheke Rams in the final to win the Shield.

Sharman Cup
The bottom eight teams in the Fox Memorial Qualification Series took part in the SAS Sharman Cup. The Richmond Bulldogs were the defending champions. The grand final was held on 5 September and saw minor premiers the Howick Hornets defeat the Glenora Bears 19–12 to win the Cup. Hibiscus Coast were relegated to the Phelan Shield with the Manukau Magpies being promoted.

Fox Memorial
The top eight teams in the Fox Memorial Qualification Series took part in the Lion Red Fox Memorial. The Mt Albert Lions were the defending champions and managed to defend their title, defeating the Papakura Sea Eagles 32–10 in the final.

As minor premiers the Otahuhu Leopards were awarded the Rukutai Shield.

Awards
The Auckland Rugby League's 2009 Awards were announced on 24 October.

Lion Red Fox Memorial Player of the Year: Phillip Kahui (Mt Albert)

George Rainey Medal Fox Memorial Team of the Year:
Fullback: James Blackwell (Otahuhu)
Winger: Phillip Kahui (Mt Albert)
Centre: Toshio Laiseni (Papakura)
Standoff: Zensei Inu (Te Atatu)
Halfback: Aaron Woodhouse (Manurewa)
Prop: Dylan Davis (Marist)
Hooker: Zac Tippins (Te Atatu)
2nd Row: Sala Faalogo (Mt Albert)
Lock: Tui Samoa (East Coast Bays)

Mandron Masonry Phelan Shield Player of the Year:
Itaifale Tolefoa (Navy/North Shore Dolphins)
SAS Sharman Cup Player of the Year:
Aaron Booth (Glenora Bears)
Māori Television Rookie of the Year:
Stephen Shennan (Te Atatu Roosters)
Premiership Coach of the Year: Brent Gemmell (Mt Albert)

References

External links
Official Site

  
        
        
        
        

Auckland Rugby League seasons
Auckland Rugby League season